Pradillo is a station on Line 12 of the Madrid Metro. It is located in fare Zone B2.

References 

Line 12 (Madrid Metro) stations
Buildings and structures in Móstoles
Railway stations in Spain opened in 2003